The Rabbi Meir Toledano Synagogue (in Arabic: كنيس ربي مير طوليدانو) is a synagogue located in the medina of Meknes, Morocco.

The first construction of the synagogue dates from the 13th century before its destruction by an earthquake in 1630. It was rebuilt by the Toledano family (originally from Toledo) following their arrival in Meknes.

The synagogue is named after Rabbi Meir Toledano, a rabbi of the Toledano family who rose to fame by editing and publishing in 1803 his stepfather Moses ben Daniel's works on the Torah under the name Melekhet ha-Kodesh.

References 

Meknes
Synagogues in Morocco